Ghassan Hitto (born 1963) is a Syrian politician and the first head of an interim government established by the Syrian opposition National Coalition. Born in Damascus into a Kurdish family, he left Syria to the U.S. in 1980, became a naturalized American citizen and worked as an information technology executive and lived in Texas until recently. In late 2012, he relocated to Turkey. He was elected prime minister on 18 March 2013 by a narrow margin over former Syrian Arab Republic agricultural minister Assad Mustafa. Hitto resigned on 8 July 2013.

Education
Hitto graduated from Indiana University-Purdue University at Indianapolis in 1989 with degrees in mathematics and computer science. He also received an M.B.A. at Indiana Wesleyan University in 1994.

Career
Hitto is a former businessman who has lived in the United States for decades, most recently in Murphy, Texas. Before joining the opposition, he worked with Inovar, a Telecommunication firm, from 2001 to 2012.

Hitto is married to Suzanne Hitto, an American schoolteacher; they have four children, Amer, Imran, Obaida, Lama all born in the United States. He has worked in the technology sector and supported the private school Brighter Horizons Academy founded in 1989 by the Islamic Services Foundation (ISF). He is also a founding member of the Muslim Legal Fund of America created after the 11 September 2001 attacks to give legal aid to Muslims.

Hitto received 35 of 48 votes cast for the premiership, according to the BBC. Following his election, at least 12 key members of the SNC have suspended their membership partly as a result of Hitto's election on a majority vote instead of a consensus vote.

References

1963 births
Businesspeople from Texas
Anti-government politicians of the Syrian civil war
Living people
Politicians from Damascus
National Coalition of Syrian Revolutionary and Opposition Forces members
Purdue University alumni
Syrian emigrants to the United States
Syrian Kurdish people
Syrian Sunni Muslims
People from Collin County, Texas